Bassem Kamal Mohamed Ouda (born 16 April 1970), commonly known as Bassem Ouda, is an Egyptian politician who is a member of the Muslim Brotherhood and the Freedom and Justice Party (FJP). He served as Egypt's Minister of Supply and Interior Trade between January and July 2013, when he resigned due to the 2013 Egyptian coup d'état. He was later arrested, tried and sentenced to death in politically motivated trials.

Early life
Bassem Kamal Mohamed Ouda was born in Algeria in 1970.

Career
Ouda was one of the candidates for the secretariat of the FJP in 2011. He was the head of the fuel file in President Mohamed Morsi's 100-day plan during the latter's presidential champaign. He also heads the energy committee of the FJP.

Ouda was appointed Minister of Supply and Interior Trade on 5 January 2013 in a government reshuffle. Ouda replaced Zeid Mohamed in the post. Ouda was one of the FJP members serving in the cabinet that is headed by Prime Minister Hesham Qandil. He and other FJP members in the cabinet resigned from office on 4 July 2013 following the 2013 coup d'état in Egypt. Ouda's term officially ended on 16 July 2013 when the interim government led by Hazem Al Beblawi was formed.

Post-coup arrest and trial

Personal life

References

1970 births
Cairo University alumni
20th-century Egyptian engineers
Egyptian Muslim Brotherhood members
Freedom and Justice Party (Egypt) politicians
Supply and internal trade ministers of Egypt
Living people
Qandil Cabinet
21st-century Egyptian engineers